The 28th World Cup season began in late October 1993 in Sölden, Austria, and concluded in March 1994 at the World Cup finals at Vail in the United States.  The overall champions were Kjetil André Aamodt of Norway (his first) and Vreni Schneider of Switzerland (her second).

A break in the schedule in February was for the 1994 Winter Olympics in Lillehammer, Norway.  This was a shift by the International Olympic Committee to have the Winter Olympics offset from the Summer Olympics, although keeping each on four-year schedules.  As a result, this Winter Olympics took place just two years after the 1992 Winter Olympics in Albertville, France.

Calendar

Men

Ladies

Men

Overall 

see complete table

In Men's Overall World Cup 1993/94 all results count.

Downhill 

see complete table

In Men's Downhill World Cup 1993/94 all results count. Marc Girardelli won the cup without winning a single competition.

Super G 

see complete table

In Men's Super G World Cup 1993/94 all results count. Jan Einar Thorsen won the cup with only one race win. All races were won by a different athlete.

Giant Slalom 

see complete table

In Men's Giant Slalom World Cup 1993/94 all results count. Christian Mayer won the cup with only one race win.

Slalom 

see complete table

In Men's Slalom World Cup 1993/94 all results count. Alberto Tomba won his third Slalom World Cup.

Combined 

see complete table

In Men's Combined World Cup 1993/94 both results count.

Ladies

Overall 

see complete table

In Women's Overall World Cup 1993/94 all results count.

Downhill 

see complete table

In Women's Downhill World Cup 1993/94 all results count. Katja Seizinger won her third Downhill World Cup in a row. Tragically Austrian Ulrike Maier died after a bad crash in the race No. 23 at Garmisch-Partenkirchen.

Super G 

see complete table

In Women's Super G World Cup 1993/94 all results count.

Giant Slalom 

see complete table

In Women's Giant Slalom World Cup 1993/94 all results count.

Slalom 

see complete table

In Women's Slalom World Cup 1993/94 all results count. Vreni Schneider won seven races and won her fifth Slalom World Cup, the last three of them in a row.

Combined 

see complete table

In Women's Combined World Cup 1992/93 both results count.

Nations Cup

Overall

Men 

Athletes from 11 different teams were able to win competitions.

Ladies

References

External links
FIS-ski.com - World Cup standings - 1994

1993–94
World Cup
World Cup